The 2017–18 Northwestern State Lady Demons basketball team represented Northwestern State University during the 2017–18 NCAA Division I women's basketball season. The Demons, led by second year head coach Jordan Dupuy, played their home games at Prather Coliseum and were members of the Southland Conference. They finished the season 7–22, 2–16 in Southland play to finish in twelfth place. They failed to qualify for the Southland women's tournament.

Roster
Sources:

Schedule
Sources:

|-
!colspan=9 style="background:#660099; color:#FFFFFF;"| Non-conference regular season

|-
!colspan=9 style="background:#660099; color:#FFFFFF;"| Southland Conference Schedule

See also
2017–18 Northwestern State Demons basketball team

References

Northwestern State
Northwestern State Lady Demons basketball seasons
Northwestern State
Northwestern State